León Mejía (born 1934) is a former Colombian cyclist. He competed in the sprint event at the 1956 Summer Olympics.

References

1934 births
Living people
Colombian male cyclists
Olympic cyclists of Colombia
Cyclists at the 1956 Summer Olympics
Place of birth missing (living people)